Rhys H. Williams (born 1955) is Professor of Sociology and Chair of the Department of Sociology at Loyola University Chicago. He is also Director of the McNamara Center for the Social Study of Religion.

Biography
He received his undergraduate degree from the University of New Mexico in 1979 and his master's (1985) and doctoral (1988) degrees from the University of Massachusetts Amherst.

From 1989 to 2001 he taught at Southern Illinois University, Carbondale, and from 2001 until 2009 at the University of Cincinnati. Since 2009, he has taught at Loyola University Chicago. From 2003-08 he was editor of the Journal for the Scientific Study of Religion, was President of the Association for the Sociology of Religion in 2009-10 and President of the Society for the Scientific Study of Religion, 2011-12. His research interests span the fields of sociology, religious studies and political science.

Bibliography
Demerath, N. J., and Rhys H. Williams. A Bridging of Faiths: Religion and Politics in a New England City. Studies in church and state. Princeton, N.J.: Princeton University Press, 1992.
Williams, Rhys H. Cultural Wars in American Politics: Critical Reviews of a Popular Myth. Social problems and social issues. New York: Aldine de Gruyter, 1997.
Demerath, N.J. III, Peter Dobkin Hall, Terry Schmitt, and Rhys H. Williams, eds. Sacred Companies: Organizational Aspects of Religion and Religious Aspects of Organizations. New York: Oxford University Press, 1998.
Williams, Rhys H., ed. Promise Keepers and the New Masculinity: Private Lives and Public Morality. Landam: Lexington Books, 2001. 
Fuist, Todd Nicholas, Ruth Braunstein, and Rhys H. Williams, Religion and Progressive Activism: New Stories about Faith and Politics. New York: New York University Press, 2017.
Barron, Jessica M. and Rhys H. Williams. The Urban Church Imagined: Religion, Race, and Authenticity in the City. New York: New York University Press, 2017.
Williams, Rhys H., Raymond Haberski, Jr. and Philip Goff, eds. Civil Religion Today: Religion and the Nation in 21st Century America. New York: New York University Press, 2021.
and over 30 scholarly articles.

References

External links
Official web page

1957 births
Living people
University of New Mexico alumni
University of Massachusetts Amherst alumni
Southern Illinois University Carbondale faculty
University of Cincinnati faculty
Loyola University Chicago faculty
American sociologists